Events from the year 1713 in art.

Events
 Construction of Hogarth's House in London begins.

Paintings

 Sir Godfrey Kneller – James Brydges and his family
 Sebastiano Ricci – Selene and Endymion

Births
 April 21 – Anna Maria Hilfeling, Swedish miniaturist (died 1783)
 May 4 – Stefano Maria Legnani, Italian painter, active mainly in Milan (born 1661)
 July 10 - Anna Rosina de Gasc, German portrait painter (died 1783)
 August 27 – Anton August Beck, German engraver (died 1787)
 October 13 – Allan Ramsay, Scottish portrait painter (died 1784)
 October 30 – Giuseppe Antonio Landi, Italian neoclassical architect and painter of quadratura (died 1791)
 date unknown
 Johannes de Bosch, Dutch painter, engraver and draughtsman (died 1785)
 Gang Se-hwang, Korean politician, painter, calligrapher and art critic of the mid Joseon period (died 1791)

Deaths
 June 11 – Felix Meyer, Swiss painter and engraver (born 1653)
 October 15 – Johann Michael Feuchtmayer the Elder, German painter and copper engraver (born 1666)
 December 15 – Carlo Maratta, Italian painter (born 1625)
 date unknown
 Giovanni Francesco Bagnoli, Italian painter of still-life (born 1678)
 Jean François Baudesson, French painter of flowers and fruit (born 1640)
 Henry Gibbs, English oil painter (born 1630/1631)
 Jean-Baptiste Théodon, French sculptor (born 1645)

 
Years of the 18th century in art
1710s in art